John Davidson (born 1804 in Edinburgh; died 28 April 1898 at Eastbourne, Sussex) was an amateur Scottish first-class cricketer who played occasionally as a wicketkeeper. He made his first-class debut for Hampshire in a single match in 1828 against an All-England team.

In 1830 Davidson made his debut for Marylebone Cricket Club (MCC) against Middlesex. From 1830 to 1835 Davidson played in four first-class matches for the club, with his final match for the club coming against Sussex.

Davidson played his final first-class match in 1845 for Petworth Cricket Club when they played Hampshire.

Davidson died at Eastbourne, Sussex on 28 April 1898.

External links
John Davidson at Cricinfo
John Davidson at CricketArchive

1804 births
1898 deaths
Cricketers from Edinburgh
Scottish cricketers
Hampshire cricketers
Marylebone Cricket Club cricketers
Petworth cricketers